Potamocypris is a genus of ostracod crustaceans in the family Cyprididae. There are currently 44 extant species of Potamocypris. The majority of the species occur in freshwater habitats; only a few species of the genus (e.g., Potamocypris steueri) colonize marine brackish coastal waters.

Species

 Potamocypris alveolata
 Potamocypris arcuata
 Potamocypris bituminicola
 Potamocypris bowmani
 Potamocypris brachychaeta
 Potamocypris chelazzii
 Potamocypris comosa
 Potamocypris dadayi
 Potamocypris deflexa
 Potamocypris dorsomarginata
 Potamocypris elegantula
 Potamocypris fallax
 Potamocypris fulva
 Potamocypris gibbula
 Potamocypris humilis
 Potamocypris hummelincki
 Potamocypris illinoisensis
 Potamocypris insularis
 Potamocypris islagrandensis
 Potamocypris koenikei
 Potamocypris lobata
 Potamocypris mastigophora
 Potamocypris narayanani
 Potamocypris ombrophila
 Potamocypris pallida
 Potamocypris paludum
 Potamocypris philotherma
 Potamocypris problematica
 Potamocypris reticulata
 Potamocypris saskatchewanensis
 Potamocypris schubarti
 Potamocypris similis
 Potamocypris smaragdina
 Potamocypris steueri
 Potamocypris stewarti
 Potamocypris sudzukii
 Potamocypris unicaudata
 Potamocypris variegata
 Potamocypris villosa
 Potamocypris worthingtoni
 Potamocypris zschokkei

References

External links
 

Podocopida genera
Cyprididae